Ruprechtia apetala is a species of deciduous tree in the family Polygonaceae. It is found in Argentina and Bolivia. It is threatened by habitat loss. In autumn, its leaves turn bright yellow and orange.

References

Polygonaceae
Near threatened plants
Taxonomy articles created by Polbot